Kolanka may refer to:

Koła, feminine form Kolanka, Polish noble family
Barbara Kolanka (end of the 15th century–1550), Polish noblewoman
Kolanka Venkata Raju, mridangam player
Kolanka Cup, polo trophy awarded in the India